Raquel Pennington is an American mixed martial artist who competes in Ultimate Fighting Championship women's featherweight division.

Other
 Raquel Pennington was a friend of Amber Heard that lived in an adjacent penthouse owned by Johnny Depp during their marriage and who testified in the Depp v. Heard trial.

Pennington, Raquel